Dolichopus longicornis is a species of fly in the family Dolichopodidae. It is found in the  Palearctic .

References

External links
Images representing Dolichopus at BOLD

longicornis
Insects described in 1831
Asilomorph flies of Europe